Peter Knight Walker (6 December 1919 – 28 December 2010) was an Anglican bishop.

Early life and education
Walker was educated at Leeds Grammar School and The Queen's College, Oxford.

During the Second World War, he served in the Royal Naval Volunteer Reserve (RNVR). He was then a teacher at The King's School, Peterborough and Merchant Taylors' School, Northwood.

Ordained ministry
Walker was ordained in 1954. His first ordained ministry position was a curacy at Hemel Hempstead, after which he was fellow, dean and lecturer at Corpus Christi College, Cambridge. From 1962 to 1972 he was principal of Westcott House, Cambridge.

In 1972 he was consecrated to the episcopate as the Suffragan Bishop of Dorchester. In 1977 he was translated to become the Bishop of Ely, a position he held until his retirement in 1989.

Death
He died in Cambridge on 28 December 2010, aged 91.

References

1919 births
2010 deaths
People educated at Leeds Grammar School
Alumni of The Queen's College, Oxford
Royal Naval Volunteer Reserve personnel of World War II
Fellows of Corpus Christi College, Cambridge
Anglican bishops of Dorchester
Bishops of Ely
20th-century Church of England bishops
Staff of Westcott House, Cambridge